The Lattice C Compiler was released in June 1982 by Lifeboat Associates and was the first C compiler for the IBM Personal Computer. The compiler sold for $500 and would run on PC DOS or MS-DOS (which at the time were the same product with different brandings). The hardware requirements were 96KB of RAM and two floppy drives. It was ported to many other platforms, such as mainframes (MVS), minicomputers (VMS), workstations (UNIX), OS/2, the Commodore Amiga, Atari ST and the Sinclair QL.

The compiler was subsequently repackaged by Microsoft under a distribution agreement as Microsoft C version 2.0. Microsoft developed their own C compiler that was released in April 1985 as Microsoft C Compiler 3.0. Lattice was purchased by SAS Institute in 1987 and rebranded as SAS/C. After this, support for other platforms dwindled until compiler development ceased for all platforms except IBM mainframes. The product is still available in versions that run on other platforms, but these are cross compilers that only produce mainframe code.

Some of the early 1982 commercial software for the IBM PC was ported from CP/M (where it was written for the BDS C subset of the C language) to MS-DOS using Lattice C including Perfect Writer, PerfectCalc, PerfectSpeller and PerfectFiler. This suite was bundled with the Seequa Chameleon and Columbia Data Products.
 LMK, make tool
 LSE, screen editor
 TMN, text management utilities

Reception
In a 1983 review of five C compilers for the IBM PC, BYTE chose Lattice C as the best in the "superior quality, but expensive and unsuited to the beginner" category. It cited the software's "quick compile and execution times, small incremental code, best documentation and consistent reliability". PC Magazine that year similarly praised Lattice C's documentation and compile-time and runtime performance, and stated that it was slightly superior to the CI-C86 and c-systems C compilers.

References

External links 
 
 Note: As of 2023, the domain lattice.com is used by a new company

C (programming language) compilers
Amiga development software
Atari ST software
DOS software
IBM mainframe software